The Enoch Mgijima Local Municipality council was established in 2016, and consists of sixty-eight members elected by mixed-member proportional representation. Thirty-four councillors are elected by first-past-the-post voting in thirty-four wards, while the remaining thirty-four are chosen from party lists so that the total number of party representatives is proportional to the number of votes received. In the election of 1 November 2021 the African National Congress (ANC) won a majority of 44 seats.

Results 
The following table shows the composition of the council after past elections.

August 2016 election

The following table shows the results of the 2016 election.

November 2021 election

The following table shows the results of the 2021 election.

By-elections from November 2021
The following by-elections were held to fill vacant ward seats in the period from November 2021.

A by-election was held in ward 33 on 20 April 2022 after the court ordered a rerun due to irregularities. Independent candidate Ntombekhaya Kortman, who had lost by 4 votes in 2021, won the rerun. Kortman died later that year after an illness, and in a by-election held on 30 November, the ANC regained the seat.

References

Enoch Mgijima
Elections in the Eastern Cape
Enoch Mgijima Local Municipality